"Rain in Ibiza" is a song by German DJ Felix Jaehn & The Stickmen Project featuring British singer Calum Scott. It was released on 25 February 2022. 

Upon release Felix Jaehn said "I'm glad to have gotten to collaborate with talents like The Stickmen Project and to be reunited on this record with Calum Scott. It's a really lighthearted song about meeting someone new and the excitement that comes with that, and I feel like it’s exactly the right energy to kick off the year."

Reception
Michael Major from Broadway World called the song a "pulsating pop/dance anthem". Akshay Bhanawat from The Music Essentials said, "The tune immediately kicks off with Calum Scott's textured vocal, quickly followed by a rising tension and a hefty bass drop. The propelling production is perfectly paired alongside a catchy beat, four-on-the-floor rhythm and a larger-than-life ambiance" calling the song "a prime party track to ring in the new year" and "a stellar addition to all three artists' flourishing back-catalogs".

Charts

Weekly charts

Year-end charts

Certifications

References

2022 singles
2022 songs
Calum Scott songs
Felix Jaehn songs
Songs written by Calum Scott
Songs written by Jon Maguire